Hutton Lake National Wildlife Refuge is located in southern Albany County in the U.S. state of Wyoming and includes 1,968 acres (8 km2). The refuge is managed by the U.S. Fish and Wildlife Service an agency within the U.S. Department of the Interior. The refuge is located at higher altitudes over 7,000 feet (2,133 m) and has a total of five natural alpine lakes that are named, as well as associated wetlands. The refuge was set aside in 1932 to protect habitat for migratory bird species and other indigenous plants and animals. Hutton Lake NWR is administered by the Arapaho National Wildlife Refuge in Colorado.

References

External links
 

Protected areas of Albany County, Wyoming
National Wildlife Refuges in Wyoming
Wetlands of Wyoming
Landforms of Albany County, Wyoming
Protected areas established in 1932
1932 establishments in Wyoming